Ananthapuram is a panchayat town in Viluppuram district in the state of Tamil Nadu, India.

Demographics

 India census, Ananthapuram had a population of 5869. Males constitute 50% of the population and females 50%. Ananthapuram has an average literacy rate of 61%, higher than the national average of 59.5%; with 60% of the males and 40% of females literate. 11% of the population is under 6 years of age.

References

Cities and towns in Viluppuram district